Neochori (Greek: Νεοχώρι meaning new village) is a village and a community in the municipality of Orestiada in the northern part of the Evros regional unit in Greece. The community includes the village Patagi. It is situated 7 km west of the centre of Orestiada.

Population

History

It was annexed to Greece in 1920, prior it was ruled by the Ottomans.  It adopted its current name after the annexation, refugees flowed into the village and the Turkish population was displaced eastward.

See also
List of settlements in the Evros regional unit

References

External links
Neochori on GTP Travel Pages

Populated places in Evros (regional unit)
Orestiada